Inter may refer to:

Association football clubs
 Inter Milan, an Italian club
 SC Internacional, a Brazilian club
 Inter Miami CF, an American club
 FC Inter Sibiu, a Romanian club
 FC Inter Turku, a Finnish club
 FK Inter Bratislava, a former Slovak club
 NK Inter Zaprešić, a Croatian club
 FC Internaţional Curtea de Argeş, a Romanian club
 Esporte Clube Internacional, a Brazilian club from Santa Maria
 Esporte Clube Internacional (SC), a Brazilian club from Lages
 Associação Atlética Internacional, a Brazilian club from Limeira
 Inter Luanda, an Angolan club
 Inter Baku FK, an Azerbaijani club
 Inter Club d'Escaldes, an Andorran club
 Inter Leipzig, a German club
 Inter de Grand-Goâve, a Haitian club
 Internacional de Madrid, a Spanish club
 Inter Moengotapoe, a Surinamese club
 Inter Cardiff FC, a Welsh club

Other
 To put into a grave; bury
 An intersex person
 Inter TV, a television channel dedicated to Inter Milan
 Inter (TV channel), Ukrainian TV-channel
 Inter (Venezuelan broadcaster), a Venezuelan telecommunications company
 Inter FS, a Spanish futsal club
 Inter (band), British band
 Inter-American University of Puerto Rico
 Ralf Brown's Interrupt List, a comprehensive list of x86 interrupts and structures
 Intermediate tyre, a type of wet-weather tyre used in racing

See also
 
 
 Interact (disambiguation)
 Interchange (disambiguation)
 Interior (disambiguation)